Zooloo is a 2005 short film directed by Nicolas Bazz.

Plot 
Between digital pirates and high sea pirates there are the Zooloos.

On the mic of their cult radio show, Rob and Nemo get the scoop... No matter what.

Tonight, as they're going after the Mayor of Paris, they 're about to fall in an ambush set up by Chief Inspector Hans (Pierre Richard) and his second in command.

Cast 

Rob : 

Juan : Jean-Claude Dreyfus

Mayor's Neighbour : Élise Larnicol

Doc Galaxy : Pierre-François Martin-Laval

Chief inspector Hans : Pierre Richard

The Mayor of Paris : François Rollin

Cop : 

Nemo : Steve Suissa

Cop :

Production credits 

Directed by: 

Written by: Nicolas Bazz

Produced by:  and Nicolas Bazz

Music by: 

Cinematography:

References 
 

2005 short films